Lyle Vernon Blackwood (born May 24, 1951) is a former professional football player. He played safety position in the National Football League (NFL). Blackwood's best season was in 1977, when he intercepted 10 passes for the Baltimore Colts, helping them win their 3rd consecutive AFC East division title. He later became known for teaming alongside his brother, Glenn Blackwood with the Miami Dolphins as part of the notorious "Killer B's" defense. The two Blackwoods referred to themselves as "The Bruise Brothers."

While a Dolphin, Blackwood played alongside greats such as hall of famer Dwight Stephenson, Bob Baumhower, Bob Brudzinski, A. J. Duhe and his brother Glenn. This formidable team won several division titles (1981, 1983, 1984, 1985) and made two Super Bowl appearances (1982, 1984).

A similar Dolphin team with the "Killer B's" and company upset the 1985 Chicago Bears (15-1) and kept them from an undefeated season.

With Blackwood on defense, the "Killer B's" complemented Miami's strong offensive unit guided by hall of fame quarterback Dan Marino, wide receivers Mark Duper and Mark Clayton: "The Marks Brothers" along with coach Don Shula.

Blackwood played a total of 14 seasons in the NFL. He was born in San Antonio, Texas and attended Texas Christian University.  He finished his career with 35 interceptions and 9 defensive fumble recoveries.  In 1977, he led the NFL interceptions with 10.

Blackwood was a member of the Seattle Seahawks during their inaugural season.

References

1951 births
Living people
Players of American football from San Antonio
American football safeties
Blinn Buccaneers football players
TCU Horned Frogs football players
Cincinnati Bengals players
Seattle Seahawks players
Baltimore Colts players
Miami Dolphins players